Halszka Wasilewska (1943-present) is a Polish TV journalist. Since 1979 she worked in TVP. From 1992 to 2005 she run the morning talk show .

References

External links
Encyklopedia Onet

1943 births
Living people
Polish journalists
Polish women journalists
Date of birth missing (living people)
Place of birth missing (living people)